The 1950–51 AHL season was the 15th season of the American Hockey League. Ten teams were scheduled to play 70 games each, however the New Haven Eagles folded midseason. The Cleveland Barons won their eighth F. G. "Teddy" Oke Trophy as West Division champions, and their fifth Calder Cup as league champions.

Team changes
 The New Haven Ramblers revert to their previous name, the New Haven Eagles.
 The New Haven Eagles cease operations 28 games into the season.

Final standings
Note: GP = Games played; W = Wins; L = Losses; T = Ties; GF = Goals for; GA = Goals against; Pts = Points;

†New Haven Eagles folded midseason.

Scoring leaders

Note: GP = Games played; G = Goals; A = Assists; Pts = Points; PIM = Penalty minutes

 complete list

Calder Cup playoffs
First round
Cleveland Barons defeated Buffalo Bisons 4 games to 0.
Hershey Bears defeated Indianapolis Capitals 3 games to 0.
Pittsburgh Hornets defeated Springfield Indians 3 games to 0.
Second round
Cleveland Barons earned second round bye.
Pittsburgh Hornets defeated Hershey Bears 3 games to 0.
Finals
Cleveland Barons defeated Pittsburgh Hornets 4 games to 3, to win the Calder Cup. 
 list of scores

Trophy and award winners
Team Awards

Individual Awards

See also
List of AHL seasons

References
AHL official site
AHL Hall of Fame
HockeyDB

American Hockey League seasons
AHL